Cameron Valier Cogburn (born April 24, 1986) is an American former professional cyclist, who raced professionally with  in 2011 and  in 2014. He was a physics Ph.D. candidate at the Massachusetts Institute of Technology before joining SmartStop.

Major results
Sources:

2011
 9th Overall Tour de Toona
1st  Mountains classification
2012
 1st Mt. Washington Hillclimb
 1st Newton's Revenge
2013
 1st Road race, National Collegiate Road Championships
 1st  Overall Green Mountain Stage Race
1st Stage 1 
 1st  Overall Mt. Hood Cycling Classic
 1st Mount Washington Hillclimb
 1st Wilmington-Whiteface 100k MTB
 National Amateur Road Championships
2nd Road race
3rd Time trial
 4th Leadville Trail 100 MTB
2014
 1st  Overall SRS No. 3: Asheville Omnium
1st Stages 1 & 3 
 3rd Wilmington-Whiteface 100k MTB
 8th Time trial, National Road Championships

References

External links
 

1986 births
Living people
American male cyclists
People from Asheville, North Carolina